Eliseina is a village in Mezdra Municipality in Vratsa Province, northwestern Bulgaria.  it has 390 inhabitants. The village is situated on the northern slopes of Stara Planina in a region rich in copper, lead and zinc deposits. There is a small copper smelter near the village.

References

Villages in Vratsa Province